Aleksandar Ignjatović (Serbian Cyrillic: Александар Игњатовић; born 11 April 1988 in Niš) is a Serbian professional footballer who plays as a defender for RoundGlass Punjab in the I-League.

Club career
Ignjatović started his career in the youth squads of Radnicki Nis, a club playing in the Serbian First League. In the season 2006–07, he made his first appearance in the club's first team and quickly became a regular starter in the Radnički line-up. After two successful seasons Ignjatović earned a transfer to FK Borac Čačak.

In the summer of 2008, Ignjatović joined Borac Čačak, making his debut on the highest level in Serbia, the Serbian SuperLiga. On 17 July 2008, he made his official European debut in the UEFA Cup first qualifying round match against FC Dacia Chişinău.

On 26 June 2009, the Dutch club Feyenoord announced the arrival of Borac Čačak defender Ignjatović on a season-long loan, with a view to a permanent deal. However, the towering defender failed to make an impression at the Rotterdam side. Ignjatović didn't play a single match for Feyenoord and returned to Borac Čačak during the winter transfer period.

RoundGlass Punjab 
In September 2022, I-League club RoundGlass Punjab announced the signing of Ignjatović, on a one-year deal.

International career
Ignjatović made his international debut for the Serbia U21 squad in a friendly match against Cyprus U21 on 11 February 2009.

Club statistics

Club

References

External links
 Voetbal International – Aleksandar Ignjatović 
 Aleksandar Ignjatović Stats at Utakmica.rs
 

1988 births
Living people
Sportspeople from Niš
Serbian footballers
Serbia under-21 international footballers
Association football defenders
FK Radnički Niš players
FK Borac Čačak players
FK Novi Pazar players
Feyenoord players
Budapest Honvéd FC players
FK Sloboda Tuzla players
KF Laçi players
Serbian First League players
Serbian SuperLiga players
Nemzeti Bajnokság I players
Serbian expatriate footballers
Expatriate footballers in the Netherlands
Expatriate footballers in Hungary
Expatriate footballers in Albania
Serbian expatriate sportspeople in the Netherlands
Serbian expatriate sportspeople in Hungary
Serbian expatriate sportspeople in Albania